Natália María Bernardo dos Santos (born 25 December 1986) is an Angolan handball player for Primeiro de Agosto and the Angola women's national handball team.

She participated at the 2011 and 2013 World Women's Handball Championships in Brazil and Serbia, and the 2008, 2012 and 2016 Summer Olympics.

Natália was named the best player of the 2016 African Women's Handball Championship.

Personal life
Natália is a half-sister to fellow handball players Marcelina Kiala and Luísa Kiala.

Achievements 
Carpathian Trophy:
Winner: 2019

References

External links

1986 births
Living people
Angolan female handball players
Handball players at the 2008 Summer Olympics
Handball players at the 2012 Summer Olympics
Handball players at the 2016 Summer Olympics
Olympic handball players of Angola
Handball players from Luanda
African Games gold medalists for Angola
African Games medalists in handball
Competitors at the 2011 All-Africa Games
Competitors at the 2019 African Games
Handball players at the 2020 Summer Olympics